The Bovanenkovo gas field is a natural gas field located in the Yamalo-Nenets Autonomous Okrug. It was discovered in 1972 and developed by Gazprom. It began production in 2012 and produces natural gas and condensates. The Bovanenkovo gas field is part of the Yamal project.

Drilling of the first production well started in late 2008, when construction of the Bovanenkovo–Ukhta section of the Yamal–Europe pipeline also started.

Transportation
The  Obskaya–Bovanenkovo railway was built from Obskaya to provide all year access to the Bovanenkovo gas field, opening in 2011. The port at Kharasavey gas field can be used in the summer. The gas field is also served by the Bovanenkovo Airport .

References

Natural gas fields in Russia